Margaret Treloar is a Canadian food scientist and product development expert.  She served as Chair of the World Board of the World Association of Girl Guides and Girl Scouts from 2008 to 2011. In 1984 she founded Treloar Product Development International Inc., a consulting firm specializing in improved methods for product development.

See also

World Scout Committee

References

External links
Treloar Product Development International Inc.
Centenary message from WAGGGS given by Margaret Treloar

Chairs of the World Board (World Association of Girl Guides and Girl Scouts)
Year of birth missing (living people)
Living people
Scouting and Guiding in Canada